Méguet is a town in the Méguet Department in Ganzourgou Province in central Burkina Faso. The population of Méguet is 7,273 and it is the capital of Méguet Department.

References

External links
 Satellite map of Méguet at Maplandia.com

Populated places in the Plateau-Central Region